Quaid Say Baatain is a Pakistani animated series about a young girl named Zainab, who is always thinking of ways to help and better Pakistan. In each episode she encounters a problem, which she then solves by remembering the words and actions of Quaid-e-Azam. The main purpose of this show was to present a role model to the Pakistani children.
The show has tried to spread special messages among the youth. In one episode, it tried to convey the message of spreading peace and protecting Pakistan following the 2014 Peshawar school massacre.

See also 

 List of Pakistani animated television series

References

Pakistani animated television series
Pakistani children's television series
Pakistani speculative fiction television series
2013 Pakistani television series debuts